True Tiger are a dubstep/grime production group, formerly composed of Sukh Knight, Gowers, Blue Bear, Stanza & Chunky. The group disbanded in early 2014.

Singles

References

Dubstep music groups